Voice of Tibet is a radio station based in Norway transmitting shortwave radio programmes in the Tibetan language as well as Mandarin Chinese. The station began broadcasting on 14 May 1996 and was founded by three Norwegian NGOs: Norwegian Human Rights House, The Norwegian Tibet Committee and Worldview Rights. Its broadcasts target Tibet and China as well as India, Bhutan and Nepal. It receives funds from the United States National Endowment for Democracy.

Voice of Tibet states that its goal is to provide news on Tibetan life, culture, events, and issues both inside Tibet and in the global Tibetan exile community. They air the Dalai Lama's latest public speeches in serialised form. With a portion of programming targeting Chinese listeners, they report on democracy movements in China. They carry reports on environmental issues, health care (both traditional and modern), and global affairs.

Broadcasts of Voice of Tibet reach China and Tibet through transmitters in the Indian Ocean as well as in Russia and Central Asia. The PRC attempts to jam signals from the Voice of Tibet from reaching Tibetans with Communist China.

See also
 International Campaign for Tibet
 Radio Free Asia
 Radio jamming in China
 Voice of America

References

External links 
 

Shortwave radio stations
Mass media in Tibet
Tibetan independence movement
Tibetan-language radio stations